The Real Academia de Bellas Artes de San Fernando (RABASF), located on the Calle de Alcalá in the heart of Madrid, currently functions as a museum and gallery.

History 
The academy was established by royal decree in 1752. About twenty years later, the enlightened monarch Charles III purchased a palace in Madrid as the academy's new home. The building had been designed by José Benito de Churriguera for the Goyeneche family. The king commissioned Diego de Villanueva to convert the building for academic use, employing a neoclassical style in place of Churriguera's baroque design.

The academy is also the headquarters of the Madrid Academy of Art.

Notable alumni 

The first graduate of the academy was Bárbara María Hueva. Francisco Goya was once one of the academy's directors. Its alumni include Felip Pedrell, Pablo Picasso, Kiko Argüello, Remedios Varo, Salvador Dalí, Antonio López García, Juan Luna, Fernando Amorsolo, Oscar de la Renta, Ricardo Macarrón, Alicia Iturrioz, and Fernando Botero.

Collection 
Doubling as a museum and gallery, today it houses a fine art collection of paintings from the 15th to 20th centuries: Hans Müelich, Arcimboldo, Giovanni Bellini, Juan de Juanes, Antonio Allegri da Correggio, Luis de Morales, Martin de Vos, Marinus van Reymerswaele, Otto Van Veen, Leandro Bassano, il Cavaliere d'Arpino, Guido Reni, Rubens, Domenichino, Jan Janssens, Giovanni Battista Beinaschi, Bartolomeo Cavarozzi, Daniel Seghers, José de Ribera, Andrea Vaccaro, Jacob Jordaens, Pieter Boel, Claudio Coello, Juan Van der Hamen y León, Van Dyck, Pieter Claesz, Antonio de Pereda, Diego Velázquez, Margherita Caffi, Carreño de Miranda, Paul de Vos, Alonso Cano, Zurbarán, Murillo, Francesco Battaglioli, Jean Ranc, Jacopo Amigoni, Agostino Masucci, Fragonard, Corrado Giaquinto, Domenico Tiepolo, Alessandro Magnasco, Pompeo Battoni, Antonio Joli, Luis Paret y Alcázar, Mengs, Goya, Giuseppe Pirovani (one rare Portrait of George Washington), Joaquín Sorolla, Ignacio Zuloaga, Juan Gris, Pablo Serrano, Fernando Zobel, Lorenzo Quiros, among others.

Gallery

References
Citations

Bibliography

External links
 Real Academia de Bellas Artes de San Fernando
 Collections of the RABASF 
 Android and iOS Official mobile app
Virtual tour of the Real Academia de Bellas Artes de San Fernando provided by Google Arts & Culture

Museums in Madrid
Art museums and galleries in Madrid
Art schools in Spain
Calle de Alcalá
Bien de Interés Cultural landmarks in Madrid
Educational institutions established in 1752
B
1752 establishments in Spain
Culture in Madrid